Pöntinen is a surname. Notable people with the surname include:

Joonas Pöntinen (born 1990), Finnish footballer
Roland Pöntinen (born 1963), Swedish pianist and composer
Seija Pöntinen (1934–1998), Finnish hurdler

Surnames of Scandinavian origin